The Writers Guild of America Award for Television: Comedy/Variety - Sketch Series is an award presented by the Writers Guild of America to the best writing in a comedy/variety sketch series, until 2015, sketch series competed along with comedy/variety talk programs in the category Television: Comedy-Variety Talk Series. In 2016, a separate category was added only for sketch series.

Winners and nominees

2010s

2020s

Programs with multiple awards
 2 awards
 Inside Amy Schumer (Comedy Central)
 Saturday Night Live (NBC)
 I Think You Should Leave with Tim Robinson (Netflix)

Programs with multiple nominations
 6 nominations
 Saturday Night Live (NBC)

 3 nominations
 At Home with Amy Sedaris (truTV)
 Inside Amy Schumer (Comedy Central)
 Nathan for You (Comedy Central)

 2 nominations
 Portlandia (IFC)
 I Think You Should Leave with Tim Robinson (Netflix)
 How To with John Wilson (HBO)

See also
 Primetime Emmy Award for Outstanding Writing for a Variety Series

References

Writers Guild of America Awards